The W.O. Mitchell Literary Prize was a Canadian literary award, presented by the Writers' Trust of Canada to a writer who produced an outstanding body of work, acted during his/her career as a "caring mentor" for writers, and published a work of fiction or had a new stage play produced during the three-year period specified for each competition. The rules of the prize stipulated that every third year the winner be francophone. The prize is no longer awarded.

The prize was named in memory of Canadian writer W.O. Mitchell, who died in 1998.

Winners

1998 - Barry Callaghan
1999 - Austin Clarke
2000 - Marie-Claire Blais
2001 - Audrey Thomas
2002 - Leon Rooke
2003 - Nicole Brossard

References

Awards established in 1998
1998 establishments in Canada
Literary awards honoring writers